The Lenduic or Lendu–Ngiti languages of the Central Sudanic language family are a cluster of closely related languages spoken in the Democratic Republic of Congo, and slightly over the border into Uganda.

The languages are Lendu (Balendru), with over a million speakers, and the smaller Ngiti and Ndrulo, as well as perhaps an additional language or two among the 'dialects' of Balendru.

See also
Central Sudanic word lists (Wiktionary)

Footnotes

References
 Nilo-Saharan list (Blench 2000)

Central Sudanic languages
Languages of South Sudan